Vera Wentworth (born Jessie Alice Spink; 1890 – 1957) was a British suffragette, who notably door-stepped and then assaulted the Prime Minister on two occasions. She was incarcerated for the cause and was force fed, after which she wrote "Three Months in Holloway"

Life
Wentworth was born in 1890,  to Harry Laing Spink and his wife, Rachel Amanda (née Goode). She had one sibling, brother William Wilfrid Spink. After leaving school she found work in a shop going on to become an active trade unionist.

In 1907, she formally changed her name to Vera Wentworth, and began living with Caprina Fahey in London. In 1908 she joined the Women's Social and Political Union. She was quickly arrested demonstrating outside the House of Commons. Her sentence was six weeks in prison; an extra day was added to Wentworth's sentence after she carved "Votes for Women" into her cell wall. Upon release, Wentworth and others were met by Mary Blathwayt, beginning a lon friendship between the two women. Following her release, Wentworth joined a secret spin-off group called the Young Hot Bloods, which pledged to undertake "danger duty" in the name of women’s suffrage. Of the older suffragettes, only Emmeline Pankhurst was permitted to sit in on their meetings at a tea shop on London’s Strand. Elder suffragist Emily Blathwayt found Wentworth so charming but wayward that she affectionately referred to her as "the young hooligan we know".

In June she was arrested again for demonstrating outside the House of Commons. This time she was given a three month sentence, after which she published "Should Christian Women Demand the Vote" and "Three Months in Holloway". Wentworth was a writer with an ambition to attend university, and member of the Women Writer's Suffrage League.

Wentworth was then based in Bristol with other suffragettes including Annie Kenney, Violet Bland, and Elsie Howey. She gained another three month prison sentence when she and Howey were arrested for demonstrating outside H. H. Asquith's house.

Vera was invited to Mary Blathwayt's home at Batheaston, where the leading suffragettes met. Significant visitors were asked to plant a tree to record their achievements on behalf of the cause. Wentworth was given a Hunger Strike Medal 'for Valour' by WSPU.

Wentworth and Jessie Kenney were jailed for assaulting the Prime Minister. On 5 September 1909 Wentworth, Kenney and Elsie Howey assaulted Prime Minister H. H. Asquith and the Home Secretary Herbert Gladstone during a golf match. Elsie Howey and Wentworth then tried to contact Asquith at his church. They were protesting the imprisonment of Patricia Woodlock and others whilst the Prime Minister was enjoying a holiday, and decorated his private garden bushes with leaflets and cards. These direct actions proved too much for the Blathwayt family. Emily resigned from the WSPU and Linley wrote letters of protest to Christabel Pankhurst, Elsie Howey and Wentworth. Pankhurst was told that Howey and Wentworth could not visit their house again. Wentworth sent them a long reply expressing regret at their reaction but noting that "if Mr. Asquith will not receive deputation they will pummel him again".

During this period her brother, an eighteen-year-old journalist who had been the leader of an unsuccessful unofficial strike of women workers in the East End of London, introduced her to Fenner Brockway, who called 'Wilfie Spink' his 'explosive friend'  and stated that she became his girlfriend. However, as the WSPU increased in the use of more violent action he distanced himself from them (he was a pacifist) and all personal acquaintances appear to have died by around 1910.

Wentworth achieved her ambition of attending a university when she started at St Andrews University in 1912 and she was there until 1914.

On 6 August 1913 she, with Elisabeth Freeman and Elsie McKenzie were in America to support 'Colonel' Ida Craft of the Yankee Corps on a suffrage hike from New York to Boston, via  Stamford, Norwalk, Bridgeport, Milford, New Haven, Wallingford, Meriden, New Britain, Hartford, Marlboro, Waltham to Harvard Square, Cambridge, Massachusetts arriving on 30 August. Finally, on Labor Day, 1 September 1913, they departed at 11 am with other suffragists, to hold a meeting on Boston Common at 12.30 pm.

On 4 August 1914 the First World War began. The WSPU did a deal with government and they agreed to end all protests in return for having all of their prisoners released. Wentworth respected this line and ceased work with the WSPU.

From 1914 to 1918 she joined the Voluntary Aid Detachment (VAD) as a nurse (a common occupation for suffragettes during this time) then became an administrator in the Queen Mary's Army Auxiliary Corps (1918–1920), following which she resided in Hendon, Middlesex with Daisy Carden. During the Second World War she worked in London in the Air Raid Precautions.

Wentworth died in Elizabeth Garrett Anderson Hospital in 1957 and bequeathed all her assets to her partner in her will.

References

1890 births
1957 deaths
Eagle House suffragettes
Hunger Strike Medal recipients